Bhagyalakshmi is a 1961 Indian Tamil-language film directed by K. V. Srinivasan. The film stars Gemini Ganesan and Sowcar Janaki. It was released on 7 November 1961.

Plot 

Kamala, a young widow and a victim of child marriage, and Radha are best friends. When Radha marries Sunder, Kamala moves in with them. When Kamala comes across a photograph, that hints that her husband may be alive, changes her life forever.

Cast 
The list was adapted from the film's credits

Male cast
Gemini Ganesan as Dr.Sundar
K. A. Thangavelu as Velu
K. Natarajan
 Karikol Raju
Balakrishnan
Master Sridhar as Gopi
V. Nagayya (Guest)
Friend Ramasami (Guest)

Female cast
Sowcar Janaki as Bhagyalakshmi
E. V. Saroja as Radha
P. Kannamba as Parvathi
M. Saroja as Sulukku Sundari
C. K. Saraswathi
M. Radhabai
S. N. Lakshmi
Baby Savithri as Kamala

Production 
The film was produced by Pattanna under the banner Narayanan Company and was directed by K. V. Srinivasan. Cinematography was handled by G. Balakrishna while the editing was done by S. R. Chandrasekaran and K. A. Sriramulu. A. K. Sekar was in charge of art direction. Choreography was done by Chinni — Sampath, K. Thangappan and Thangaraj. T. S. Rangasamy was in charge of audiography. Still photography was done by N. Ramachar and Jeeva. The film was made at Majestic, Narasu and Prasath (for outdoor) studios and processed at Gemini laboratory.

Soundtrack 
Music was composed by the duo Viswanathan–Ramamoorthy while the lyrics were penned by Papanasam Sivan, Kannadasan and V. Seetharaman. The song "Maalai Pozhudhin" was a chartbuster and was based on Chandrakauns raga. Veena was played by R. Pichumani Iyer. The song Singara Solaiye was originally written as Kalloori Ranikaal and was released in the records. But the censor board objected to the wording so it was changed in the film.

References

External links 

1960s Tamil-language films
1961 films
Films scored by Viswanathan–Ramamoorthy
Films directed by K. V. Srinivasan